The Ministry of External Relations ( or MIREX) of the Dominican Republic is the government institution in charge of foreign affairs. It's responsible of coordinating the foreign policy of the Dominican Republic along the President, in accordance with Article 128 of the Constitution. It is commonly known as the Chancellery (Cancillería)

It was created on 1874 as the Secretaría de Estado de Relaciones Exteriores. Its headquarters are located at Santo Domingo. Its current Minister is Roberto Álvarez, since August 16, 2020.

History 
Since the early days of the Dominican Republic, the external relations focused on securing a protectorate with a foreign power, be it Spain, France or United Kingdom. This led to president Pedro Santana signing the annexation of the Dominican Republic to Spain, becoming once again a Spanish colony.

It is during the Second Republic that the Secretary of State of External Relations (Secretaría de Estado de Relaciones Exteriores) is created on 1874. During this period, some of the most distinguished men of the time were in charge of Dominican diplomacy, such as Ulises Espaillat, Pedro Francisco Bonó, Manuel de Jesús Galván, among others.

The Second Republic saw the interference of the United States into the politics and economy of the Dominican Republic. During the presidency of Ramón Cáceres, Dominican Customs were under direct supervision of the United States. The political instability of the time led to the United States occupation of the Dominican Republic between 1916-1924.

The Third Republic was characterized by the dictatorship of Rafael Trujillo. The Chancellery was nuder the control of the regime. The dictator himself occupied the position of Chancellor in 1938 and 1953.

In 1945, the Dominican Republic was one of the founding members of the United Nations. Ambassador Minerva Bernardino, first female diplomat of the Dominican Republic, signed the Charter of the United Nations in name of the country. It is also one of the founding members of the Organization of American States since 1948.

During the Fourth Republic, the country has been more actively involved in foreign affairs, particularly within the Caribbean region.

With the 2010 Constitutional reform, the office became the Ministry of External Relations (Ministerio de Relaciones Exteriores) with Decree no. 56–10.

Internal structure 
As all other Ministries of the Dominican Republic, the Ministry of External Relations is subdivided into viceministries. These are:

 Viceministry of Bilateral Foreign Policy
 Viceministry of Multilateral Foreign Policy
 Viceministry of Economic Matters and International Cooperation
 Viceministry of Consular Matters and Migration
 Viceministry of Dominican Communities Abroad

Other offices of lower rank are:

 State Ceremonial and Protocol Office
 Specialized Diplomacy Office
 Borders and Limits Office
 Special Passport Department

Dependent agencies 
Some offices with a special link with the Ministry are:

 General Passport Office
 National Council for Borders
 Institute of Dominicans Abroad (INDEX)
 Institute Dr. Eduardo Latorre Rodríguez of Higher Education on Diplomatic and Consular Training (INESDYC)

See also
 List of diplomatic missions of the Dominican Republic

References

External links
 Ministry of External Relations - official website 

Dominican Republic
Government of the Dominican Republic